STIV may refer to:

 Sulfolobus turreted icosahedral virus 1 (STIV1) formerly "sulfolobus turreted icosahedral virus" (STIV)
 Star Trek IV: The Voyage Home, fourth film in the original film series
 Untitled sequel to Star Trek Beyond, fourth film in the J.J.Abrams film series, see Star Trek Beyond#Sequel
 Starship Troopers: Invasion, fourth film in the Starship Troopers film series

See also
 ST4 (disambiguation)